Below is a list of records held in the Ultimate Fighting Championship (UFC).

Fighting

Most bouts

Most bouts - All fighters
On December 16, 1994, Royce Gracie became the first fighter to reach 10 fights in the UFC.

On July 7, 2007, Tito Ortiz became the first fighter to reach 20 fights in the UFC.

On September 8, 2018, Jim Miller became the first fighter to reach 30 fights in the UFC.

On July 2, 2022, Jim Miller became the first fighter to reach 40 fights in the UFC.

Updated as of March 4, 2023 after UFC 285.

Most bouts - By division
Updated as of March 11, 2023 after UFC Fight Night: Yan vs. Dvalishvili.

Most bouts or wins - In a calendar year

Most total fight time

Most total fight time - All fighters
Updated to March 4, 2023.

Most total fight time - By division
Updated to March 11, 2023

Most PPV Main Events

1.Minimum 10 pay-per-view main events.

Winning

Most wins

Most wins - All fighters

Updated as of March 4, 2023 after UFC 285.

Most wins - By division
Updated as of  November 5, 2022 after UFC Fight Night: Rodriguez vs. Lemos.

Highest win percentage

Minimum of 10 fights

Most consecutive wins
Updated as of March 11, 2023 after UFC Fight Night: Yan vs. Dvalishvili.

Finishes

Most finishes

Most finishes - All fighters
Updated as of March 4, 2023 after UFC 285.

Most Finishes - By division
Updated to November 5, 2022.

Most Finishes - In a single event

Highest Percentage of Finishes - In a single event

Fastest Finishes

Fastest Finishes - All fighters
Updated to 13 June, 2021.

Fastest Finishes - By division
Updated to 13 June, 2021.

Latest Finishes

Latest Finishes - All fighters

Latest Finishes - By division

Highest Finishes per win percentage
Since UFC adopted the rounds and judges system in UFC 21.

Updated to August 13, 2022.

1.Minimum 10 UFC wins.

Knockouts

Most knockouts

Most knockouts - All fighters
Updated to November 12, 2022.

Most knockouts - By division
Updated to December 17, 2022 (after UFC Fight Night: Cannonier vs. Strickland).

|

|}

Longest combined title reigns - By division

 Bold - Active reign.

Youngest champions

2.José Aldo was awarded the Featherweight Championship at UFC 123 but did not fight in his first UFC bout until UFC 129, at which point he was 24 years and 233 days of age. Aldo successfully defended his title at UFC 129.
 Bold - Active reign.

Oldest champions

 Bold - Active reign.

Multi-division champions
Fighters who have won championships in multiple weight classes. Tournament championships and The Ultimate Fighter winners are not included.

 Randy Couture was the first champion to hold titles in two different divisions.
 Conor McGregor was the first champion to hold two titles simultaneously.
 Daniel Cormier was the first champion to successfully defend titles in two different divisions.
 Amanda Nunes was the first champion to successfully defend two titles while holding them simultaneously.

Tournaments

Multiple tournament wins

Pound-for-pound

Pound-for-pound reigns 
Pound-for-pound rankings were first introduced by the UFC on February 5, 2013.

Updated as of March 7, 2023.

Bold - Active reign.

Longest combined pound-for-pound reigns 
Updated as of March 7, 2023.

Bold - Active reign.

Bonuses

Most overall
Updated as of September 10, 2022 after UFC 279.

Most Performance of the Night bonuses
Updated to August 13, 2022 (after UFC on ESPN: Vera vs. Cruz).

Most Fight of the Night bonuses
Updated to March 18, 2023 (after UFC 286).

Most Knockout of the Night bonuses (discontinued)

Most Submission of the Night bonuses (discontinued)

Attendances

Overall

United States

Finances
This category only scores pay-per-view buys from The Ultimate Fighting Championship event held in Denver, CO (1993) to UFC 235.  The UFC's 2019 contract with ESPN+ mandates a subscription to the over-the-top service which is the exclusive distributor of UFC pay-per-views in the United States in order to purchase the event.  UFC and ESPN do not report on pay-per-view buys starting with UFC 236.

Highest Pay-Per-View buys

Highest Pay-Per-View buys for a non-championship main event

Lowest Pay-Per-View buys for a championship main event

NOTE:  Starting with UFC 236, all pay-per-views in the United States are iPPV events where an ESPN+ subscription is required.  Neither UFC nor ESPN report PPV buys with the new format.

Biggest gates

See also 

 List of MMA records

References

External links

Ultimate Fighting Championship
Mixed martial arts lists
Sports records and statistics